Renata Maria-Anna Jungo Brüngger (born 7 August 1961) is a Swiss lawyer. She is the second female member of the Board of Management in the history of Daimler AG.

Early life
Renata Jungo completed a bilingual law degree at the University of Friborg (Switzerland) in 1985 and was admitted to the bar in 1989.

Career
From 1990, Jungo Brüngger worked as a lawyer at the Swiss law firm Bär & Karrer. In 1995, she became head of the legal department at Metro Holding AG. From 2000, she held the position of "General Counsel Corporate EMEA" and "Vice President/General Counsel Emerson Process Management EMEA" at Emerson Electric in Switzerland. In 2011, she joined Daimler AG as head of the “Legal” division. On 1 January 2016, she was appointed to the Board of Management of Daimler AG, where she took over the "Integrity and Law" department as the successor to Christine Hohmann-Dennhardt. She has been a member of Munich Re's Supervisory Board since 3 January 2017.

Personal life
Jungo Brüngger, who is a hobby mountaineer, is married to Alfred Daniel Brüngger, the couple have no children.

References

1961 births
Living people
Swiss women lawyers
University of Fribourg alumni
Women corporate executives
Mercedes-Benz Group executives
People from Fribourg